Loo Hui Phang (born 1974) is a French writer and film director.

Biography
The daughter of a Chinese father and Vietnamese mother, Hui Phang was born in Laos and grew up in Normandy. She studied modern literature and cinema. In 1997, she moved to Paris, where she became involved in independent cinema and graphic novels. Hui Phang has also written plays for children.

The following year, at the same festival, she created an installation based on Edgar Allan Poe's The Fall of the House of Usher.

Selected work

Picture books 
 Délice de vaches (2000) with 
 Merveilles de bricolage (2001) with Jean-Pierre Duffour
 Jouets plus ultra (2001) with Jean-Pierre Duffour
 Bienvenue au collège (2001) with Jean-Pierre Duffour
 Tout seuls (2003) with Jean-Pierre Duffour

Graphic novels 
 La Minute de bonheur (1999)
 Panorama (2004)
 Prestige de l'uniforme (2005), received a prize at the Angoulême International Comics Festival
 L'odeur des garçons affamés (2016)
 Nuages et Pluie (2016)

Films 
 Monde extérieur (2004), in collaboration with Michel Houellebecq
 Panorama (2006), received the Prix Nouveau Regard at the 
 Matty Groves (2013), music video for Moriarty

References

External links 

 

1974 births
Living people
French comics artists
French children's book illustrators
French film directors
French people of Chinese descent
French people of Vietnamese descent